Markaz may refer to:

Organisations 
 The Markaz, formerly the Levantine Cultural Center, a religious cultural center in West Los Angeles, California
 Markazu Saqafathi Sunniyya, a university in Kerala, India
 Markaz Knowledge City, a city project in Kozhikode, Kerala, India
 Kuwait Financial Centre (Markaz), an asset management and investment banking institution from Kuwait
 Markaz, Dubai, a religious and cultural centre of the Markaz in Dubai, UAE

Places 
 Markaz (administrative division)
 Markaz, Hungary, a village in Heves County in northern Hungary
 Markaz, Kyrgyzstan, a village in Batken Region, Kyrgyzstan
 Markaz Rif Dimashq District
 Markaz-e Garm

Other uses 
 Markaz Shabab Al-Am'ari, a Palestinian football club
 Markaz Balata,  a Palestinian football club

See also 

 Markazi Province
 Markazi Bihsud District